Adam Fox (1883–1977), Canon, was the Dean of Divinity at Magdalen College, Oxford. He was one of the first members of the literary group "Inklings".  He was Oxford Professor of Poetry and later he became Canon of Westminster Abbey. He was also warden of Radley College.

Biography
He was headmaster of the Radley College (1918–1924). Between 1938 and 1942 he was Oxford Professor of Poetry. Later he became Canon of Westminster Abbey and he is buried there in Poets' Corner.

During his time at Oxford, he wrote his long poem in four books "Old King Coel". It gets its name from King Cole, legendary British father of the Roman Empress Helena, the mother of the Emperor Constantine. As Professor of Poetry, Fox advocated poetry which is intelligible to readers, and gives enough pleasure to be read again.

He was one of the first members of the "Inklings", a literary group which also included C. S. Lewis and J. R. R. Tolkien. In his 1945 Plato for Pleasure, he tried to introduce the general public to Plato. Fox wished to make Plato well known among the English Classics once again and hoped that people would study the platonic dialogues, as well as the plays of Shakespeare. His biography of William Ralph Inge, the theologian, philosopher and Dean of St. Paul's Cathedral, was awarded the 1960 James Tait Black Memorial Prize soon after its publication.

References

Further reading
 Gerold, Thomas. "Adam Fox (1883–1977). Dichter und Christlicher Platoniker". In Inklings-Jahrbuch für Literatur und Ästhetik 19 (2001), pp. 201–214
 Glyer, Diana (2007). The Company They Keep: C. S. Lewis and J. R. R. Tolkien as Writers in Community 

1883 births
1977 deaths
Fellows of Magdalen College, Oxford
Inklings
Burials at Westminster Abbey
Canons of Westminster
Archdeacons of Westminster
James Tait Black Memorial Prize recipients
Oxford Professors of Poetry
British male poets
20th-century British poets
20th-century English male writers
Wardens of Radley College